Nuremberg is a 2000 Canadian-American television docudrama in 2 parts, based on the book Nuremberg: Infamy on Trial by Joseph E. Persico, that tells the story of the Nuremberg trials.

Plot

Part one
At the close of World War II, Hermann Göring surrenders to the United-States and enjoys the hospitality of a U.S. Army Air Force base. Samuel Rosenman, acting on the orders of U.S. President Harry S. Truman, recruits U.S. Supreme Court Justice Robert H. Jackson to prepare a war crimes tribunal against Göring and the surviving Nazi leadership. Göring, Albert Speer and others are arrested for war crimes and imprisoned in a U.S. Army stockade at Bad Mondorf in Luxembourg. Jackson, his assistant Elsie Douglas, and his prosecution team fly to Germany. Psychologist Gustave Gilbert arrives at the stockade with prisoner Hans Frank, who has attempted suicide.

Jackson negotiates with Allied representatives Sir David Maxwell-Fyfe, General Iona Nikitchenko and Henri Donnedieu de Vabres to ensure a unified prosecution. Jackson selects the Nuremberg Palace of Justice for the site of the trials and reconstruction work commences. Göring and the others are stripped of their rank and transferred to the prison in Nuremberg, where they come into conflict with the guards under the command of the strict Colonel Burton C. Andrus. Major Airey Neave serves Göring, Speer and the others with their indictments. U.S. judge Francis Biddle arrives to take control of the court but reluctantly passes the honour at Jackson's insistence. Following the suicide of prisoner Robert Ley, round-the-clock watches are posted and Gilbert is appointed prisoner liaison.

Sir Geoffrey Lawrence opens the trial with all defendants pleading not guilty, and Jackson gives a stirring opening statement. At lunch a jovial Göring holds court over the other defendants while Speer begins to show signs of remorse. Maxwell-Fyfe puts forward an emotive eyewitness account of the Nazis' genocidal policies toward Jews and others, while Jackson reads out dry documentation. As the court begins to tire of Jackson's meticulous approach, Maxwell-Fyfe urges pushing on to the witness interviews, which reveal the horrors of the concentration camps. The court is shaken by documentary footage of the camps; even Göring appears unsettled.

Part two
Speer explains Göring's dominance to Gilbert and insists that his control over the others must be broken. Göring takes the stand and begins speaking to the German people. Jackson, at Gilbert's suggestion, has Göring isolated. Under cross-examination, Göring outmaneuvers and humiliates Jackson, who later accuses Biddle of giving Göring free rein in court. Douglas talks Jackson out of tendering his resignation, and the two share a kiss. Under advice from Maxwell-Fyfe, Jackson returns to confront Göring with evidence of his crimes against the Jews and successfully dismisses the defendant’s denials.

At a Christmas party, the German housekeeper refuses to serve the Soviets, but Douglas rescues the situation before slipping away with Jackson. Gilbert visits the defendants and, under Jackson's advice, attempts to convince them to take responsibility for their crimes. Andrus relaxes the prison rules for Christmas, and Göring shares a friendly drink with his guard, Lt. Tex Wheelis. The cross-examination of the defendants intensifies and the defence calls Rudolf Höss, who casually reveals the horrors of Auschwitz. Speer is implicated in the enslavement of foreign workers by fellow defendant Fritz Sauckel and in response accepts collective responsibility for the crimes of the Nazi regime.

Gilbert interviews Göring's wife Emmy, who reveals that Hitler had ordered them all executed, which led to the family's surrender. Jackson is moved by Gilbert's summation of his examinations — that the source of the evil behind Nazi Germany was a complete lack of empathy — to give an impassioned closing statement. Göring uses his final statement to condemn the trial, and is sentenced along with several others to death by hanging. Speer uses his final statement to commend the tribunal and is sentenced to 20 years in prison. Göring commits suicide after his request to be executed by firing squad is denied. Andrus presides over the executions of the others while Jackson and Douglas head home.

Cast

Alec Baldwin as Supreme Court Justice Robert H. Jackson
Brian Cox as Hermann Göring
Christopher Plummer as Sir David Maxwell Fyfe
Jill Hennessy as Elsie Douglas
Matt Craven as Capt. Gustave Gilbert
Christopher Heyerdahl as Ernst Kaltenbrunner
Roger Dunn as Col. Robert Storey
David McIlwraith as Col. John Amen
Christopher Shyer as Col. Telford Taylor
Hrothgar Mathews as Thomas J. Dodd
Herbert Knaup as Albert Speer
Frank Moore as Hans Frank
Frank Fontaine as Wilhelm Keitel
Raymond Cloutier as Karl Dönitz
Bill Corday as Alfred Jodl
Ken Kramer as Fritz Sauckel
Max von Sydow as Samuel Rosenman
Mark Walker as Gen. Carl Spaatz
Sam Stone as Julius Streicher
Douglas O'Keeffe as Baldur von Schirach
Benoit Girard as Joachim von Ribbentrop
James Bradford as Hjalmar Schacht
Frank Burns as Wilhelm Frick
Erwin Potitt as Walther Funk
Tom Rack as Hans Fritzsche
Roc LaFortune as Rudolf Hess
Colm Feore as Rudolf Höß
Dennis St. John as Franz von Papen
Griffith Brewer as Konstantin von Neurath
Gabriel Gascon as Erich Raeder
Julien Poulin as Dr. Robert Ley
Alain Fournier as Alfred Rosenberg
René Gagnon as Arthur Seyss-Inquart
Len Cariou as Francis Biddle
David Francis as Geoffrey Lawrence, 1st Baron Oaksey
Len Doncheff as Gen. Iona Nikitchenko
Paul Hébert as Henri Donnedieu de Vabres
Michael Ironside as Col. Burton C. Andrus
Charlotte Gainsbourg as Marie-Claude Vaillant-Couturier
Geoffrey Pounsett as Maj. Airey Neave
Steve Adams as Brig. Gen. Lucius D. Clay
Paul Hopkins as Capt. Dan Kiley
Susan Glover as Emmy Göring
Scott Gibson as Lt. Tex Wheelis

Historical inaccuracies

In the film, Göring, his wife, and daughter drove and surrendered to an unnamed American air corps base in Germany on 12 May 1945. In reality, Göring, after sending an aide to Brigadier General Robert I. Stack in which he offered to surrender to Dwight D. Eisenhower personally, was discovered and arrested in a traffic jam near Radstadt by a detachment of the Seventh United States Army, which was sent through the German lines to find him and bring him to a secure American position, on 6 May 1945.

Wilhelm Keitel was described in the film as an admiral during the defendants' sentencing. He was in fact a field marshal and would not have been identified with naval rank. However, he is correctly addressed as field marshal in other parts of the film.

In the film Jackson describes the Nuremberg's Justice Palace as "the same building where Nuremberg Laws were decreed to deprive all the German Jews all of their rights". In reality, the Nuremberg Laws were introduced by the Reichstag at a special meeting at the annual Nuremberg Rally of the NSDAP. Nuremberg's Justice Palace was, as it has always been, a regional court for the local area and the building had no association with the annual Party Rally during the Nazi era.

In the film Robert Ley was shown to have committed suicide before the trial even began, in the-real life Ley committed suicide three days after receiving the indictment, on October 24, 1945. However similar with what was depicted in the film, in the real-life Ley also committed suicide by strangling himself until death with a noose that was made by his towel and was fastened to the toilet pipe in his prison cell.

Justice Jackson is portrayed as initially failing in his cross-examination of Gӧring and emerging triumphant on the second day. In reality, the cross-examination was a disaster and severely damaged Jackson's reputation [citation needed]. This situation was recovered by Maxwell Fyfe.

The verdicts and sentences were pronounced together with all defendants present. In reality, verdicts and sentences were pronounced separately and the defendants were called one at a time into the courtroom to learn their sentence. Andrus was not present at the executions.

When the defendants were indicted by Major Neave they all made oral statements. In reality, these statements were collected by Captain Gustave Gilbert. He asked the defendants to write their first reactions on a copy of the indictments.

In the film Albert Speer was arrested when he was giving a lecture to American soldiers. In reality, Speer was arrested together with Karl Dönitz and Alfred Jodl in Flensburg where they had set up a provisional government.

In the film Captain Gilbert is graciously given the right to talk to the prisoners by Col. Andrus in exchange for a library and an exercise field. In reality, Gilbert was specifically appointed to talk to the prisoners by the US military. The idea was that Andrus was to be informed by Gilbert about the state of mind of the prisoners.

The tribunal is depicted as having four judges. In reality, there were eight, a senior and a junior from each of the four Allied powers.

In the film, Göring's wife and daughter visit him in prison together shortly before his death, but in reality, only his wife was present on this final visit. Also, Göring's suicide is discovered in the film when the guards come for Joachim von Ribbentrop, whereas, in real life, Göring himself was to go first. Ribbentrop only went first after Göring's suicide.

At the executions, the condemned state their names on the gallows and make their final statements in English. In reality, the condemned said their names at the bottom of the steps to the gallows and spoke in German, with an interpreter on the gallows. In addition, all executions appear to be carried out correctly. In real life, some of the hangings were reportedly botched as not all of the executed Nazis fell with enough force to break the neck, and the trap door was too small causing bleeding head injuries to some of the men, as shown in pictures of the bodies. Only one unpainted gallows is shown with two trap doors and nooses when in real life, three black-painted gallows were in the gymnasium. Two were used with one as a spare.

The executions happened in the depth of night - not in daylight as in the film - and press photographers were not allowed in to witness the hangings themselves. Hermann Göring is also seen killing himself minutes before the executions, rather than hours.

The executions of Wilhelm Frick, Alfred Rosenberg, and Arthur Seyss-Inquart were bypassed.

Reception

In the United States, the miniseries aired on the network TNT, where it received the highest-ever viewership ratings for a basic cable miniseries up to that point.

Awards

Streaming
As of 2017 part 1 & 2 was released online on Canada Media Fund's Encore+ YouTube channel.

See also
 Judgment at Nuremberg

References

External links
 
 

2000s Canadian drama television series
2000s Canadian television miniseries
American biographical series
American television docudramas
Canadian television docudramas
Cultural depictions of Albert Speer
Cultural depictions of Hermann Göring
English-language Canadian films
Films about capital punishment
Gemini and Canadian Screen Award for Best Television Film or Miniseries winners
Nuremberg in fiction
Nuremberg trials
Primetime Emmy Award-winning television series
Television series about the aftermath of the Holocaust
Television shows directed by Yves Simoneau
Television shows set in Germany
World War II television drama series
Cultural depictions of Franz von Papen